McMillions (stylized as McMillion$) is a documentary miniseries about the McDonald's Monopoly promotion scam that occurred between 1989 and 2001. Directed by James Lee Hernandez and Brian Lazarte, the series details how the scam was perpetrated by Jerry Jacobson, the head of security for the agency that ran the promotion, and how he recruited a wide range of accomplices. The series premiered in the US on February 3, 2020, on HBO, and all episodes were made available in the UK on May 27, 2020, on Sky Documentaries. McMillions was nominated for five Primetime Creative Arts Emmy Awards, including Outstanding Documentary or Nonfiction Series.

Premise 

McMillions "examines the $24 million worth of fraud that corrupted the McDonald's Monopoly game between 1989 and 2001, in which there were almost no legitimate million-dollar winners in the contest." Through six episodes, the documentary introduces the FBI and other legal authorities who investigated the Monopoly game heist, as well as the bogus winners and the perpetrators. Using in-depth interviews with those involved in every aspect of the crime, McMillions offers an insider’s view into one of the most notorious fraud cases of the 1990s and early 2000s.

Episodes

Production 

The series is executive produced by Unrealistic Ideas' Mark Wahlberg, Stephen Levinson, Archie Gips and written, directed and also executive produced by James Lee Hernandez and Brian Lazarte.

Critical reception 
On Rotten Tomatoes, the series had an 87% rating with an average score of 7.29 out of 10 based on 31 reviews. The site's critical consensus read: "Like something out of a movie, McMillions effectively — if not always artfully — captures the chaos of this once-in-a-lifetime, very real con and the colorful cast of characters at its center." On Metacritic, it had a score of 72 out of 100 based on 15 reviews, indicating "generally favorable reviews."

Awards and nominations

References

External links 

 McMillions on HBO
 McMillions companion podcast on HBO
 

2020 American television series debuts
2020 American television series endings
2020s American documentary television series
2020s American television miniseries
English-language television shows
HBO original programming
HBO documentary films
Documentary films about McDonald's
True crime television series
Monopoly (game)
Television series by Home Box Office